Murder in the Studios (Spanish:Asesinato en los estudios) is a 1946 Mexican mystery film directed by Raphael J. Sevilla and starring David T. Bamberg, María de los Ángeles Santana and Ricardo Mondragon.

Cast
  David T. Bamberg as Fu Manchu
 María de los Ángeles Santana as Elena Palmer  
 Ricardo Mondragón as González  
 José Morcillo as Bernal 
 Ángel T. Sala as Lt. Palomino  
 Freddie Romero as Lucifer  
 José Pidal as Santos  
 Víctor Velázquez as Pepe  
 Antonio Pueyo 
 Alma Lorena as Pola Blanqui  
 Salvador Lozano as David Martín  
 Ángel Di Stefani as Raúl Roldán 
 Enriqueta Reza as Actriz criada  
 Natalia Ortiz as Sirvienta de Elena  
 Austy Russell 
 Carlos Villarías as Doctor 
 Enrique Zambrano
 Enrique Monato 
 Lupe Garnica 
 Esther Beltri 
 Rosalba Durán 
 Inocencio Pantoja 
 Alfonso Alvarado 
 Manuel Roche 
 Roberto Cañedo as Camarografo 
 Carlos Rincón Gallardo 
 Arturo Soto Urena 
 Lupe Carriles as Mesera 
 Adolfo Ballano Bueno 
 René Cardona as René Cardona  
 Esther Luquín as Actriz  
 Ramón Armengod as Ramón Armengod  
 Raphael J. Sevilla as Director  
 Pituka de Foronda 
 Ana Lou Rodríguez

References

Bibliography 
 Paulo Antonio Paranaguá. Mexican Cinema. British Film Institute, 1995.

External links 
 

1946 films
1946 mystery films
Mexican mystery films
1940s Spanish-language films
Films directed by Raphael J. Sevilla
Films about filmmaking

Mexican black-and-white films
1940s Mexican films